Don't Give Up On Love is the second studio album by American rhythm and blues musician Don Bryant. It was released on May 12, 2017 through Fat Possum Records

Track listing

Charts

References

2017 albums
Fat Possum Records albums
Don Bryant (songwriter) albums